The bare-tailed woolly mouse opossum (Marmosa regina) or short-furred woolly mouse opossum is a South American marsupial of the family Didelphidae. Its range includes Brazil, Colombia, Ecuador, Peru, and Bolivia. It is found in tropical rainforest in the westernmost portion of the Amazon Basin and the eastern foothills of the Andes, at elevations up to 1634 m. It was formerly assigned to the genus Micoureus, which was made a subgenus of Marmosa in 2009.

References

Bare-tailed woolly mouse opossum
Mammals of Bolivia
Mammals of Colombia
Mammals of Ecuador
Mammals of Peru
Taxa named by Oldfield Thomas
Mammals described in 1898

 

es:Micoureus#Micoureus regina